Al-Khaldiya Sports Club is a football club based in Hamad Town, Bahrain that competes in the Bahraini Premier League. It is the newest formed football club in Bahrain, established in 2020. Financially it is the richest Bahrain football club and most ambitious. The home ground of the team is Bahrain National Stadium with a capacity of 28.900.In the team name الخالدية It's Arabic, which means "eternity".

History 
Al-Khaldiya Sports Club was formed on 27 October 2020 and started off play in the Bahraini Second Division. In their first season, they finished 2nd with 12 wins, five draws, and just one loss, getting promoted to the Bahraini Premier League. In the qualifying round of the King's Cup, they beat Bahrain SC 6–1 but lost 1–0 to Al Riffa in the round of 16.

Season 2021–22 
Season 2021–22 is the first season of the club in the top-flight of Bahrain Football. Huge names of Bahrain football and 7 regular national team players were brought into the club. Croatian coach and Asian Champions League winner Dragan Talajić signed with the club. Instantly from an underdog position, the club became one of the most powerful teams in Bahrain. On 29 December 2021, the club reached the semifinals of the Bahrain King Cup and will play the semifinals on the 5th of February 2022 becoming the first club to do so in the first top-flight season of Bahrain football. On the 10th of February 2022, Talajić took Al Khaldiya's side to the King of Bahrain Cup 2022 Final for the first time in the club's history. On March 5, Al Khaldiya won the Bahraini King's Cup against East Riffa Club winning the first-ever top-tier trophy in the history of the club.

Players
Sources:

Current squad

Former players

Managerial history

 Dragan Talajić (10 December 2021 – current)

References

Football clubs in Bahrain
Association football clubs established in 2020
2020 establishments in Bahrain